Bagrationi was a 12th–13th century Georgian princess of the royal Bagrationi dynasty. She was a daughter of King Demetrius I of Georgia, sister of the kings David V and George III and Princess Rusudan. She was a paternal aunt of the famous Queen Tamar of Georgia.

She was a wife of Iziaslav II of Kiev.

Her first name as her later life is unknown.

References

Bagrationi dynasty of the Kingdom of Georgia
Princesses from Georgia (country)
12th-century births
13th-century deaths
Russian royal consorts